Charles Henry Collyns (1820 – 8 July 1885) was an English priest, temperance activist, translator and vegetarian.

Collyns was born in Exeter. He was educated at Christ Church, Oxford and was admitted to orders in 1844. During 1844–1845 he was curate of St Mary Magdalen's Church, Oxford. From 1867 to 1874 he was Headmaster of the Grammar School at Wirksworth, Derbyshire. Collyns was a teetotaller and vegetarian. He was secretary of the British Temperance League which was the oldest national temperance organization in England.

Collyns became a vegetarian in 1872 and joined the Vegetarian Society in September 1873 whilst a resident at Wirksworth. He became a Vice-President of the Vegetarian Society. He was also a member of the Anti-Compulsory Vaccination League, Anti-Narcotic League and the United Kingdom Alliance. He translated the works of Pacian published in the Library of the Fathers in 1844. He also translated Jean-Antoine Gleizes' Thalysie, but it was not published.

Collyns suffered from gout. He died age 65 in Sheffield on 8 July 1885.

Selected publications

Simplicity of Tastes (Vegetarian Society, 1879)
The Jubilee of Teetotalism (1882)

References

1820 births
1885 deaths
Alumni of Christ Church, Oxford
Clergy from Exeter
English temperance activists
British vegetarianism activists
English translators
People associated with the Vegetarian Society